The 2021 Bulgarian Supercup was the 18th edition of the Bulgarian Supercup, an annual football match played between the winners of the previous season's First League and the Bulgarian Cup. The game was played between the champions of the 2020–21 First League, Ludogorets Razgrad, and the 2020–21 Bulgarian Cup winners, CSKA Sofia.

This was Ludogorets's 9th Bulgarian Supercup appearance and CSKA Sofia's 6th. The two teams have not played yet for the Supercup, as the 2016 game between the two teams was not held.

Ludogorets won the game by the resounding scoreline of 4–0, claiming their 5th Supercup trophy.

Match details

References

2021
Supercup
Bulgarian Supercup
Supercup 2021
Supercup 2021